St Paul's Church, Jarrow, is a Church of England parish church in the Parish of Jarrow and Simonside, on the south bank of the River Tyne in northern England. It was founded in 681 as a part of the Monkwearmouth–Jarrow Abbey. Most of the church is later, but the chancel is the remains of a free-standing chapel of the original monastery. Above the chancel arch is a dedication stone dating to 23 April 685, making this one of, if not the oldest, church dedication stones in England. The Church was dedicated to St Paul by King Ecgfrith and Abbot Ceolfrith.

Architecture

Anglo-Saxon

The original church on the site was built in 681 at the behest of King Ecgfrith, who donated land for its constitution as a part of the Monkwearmouth–Jarrow Abbey. The chancel is the remains of a free-standing chapel of the original monastery. Within the church, in the centre of the North Nave, the foot of a fine Saxon Cross is on display, its surviving Latin inscription reads: In this unique sign, life is restored to the word. On an inner wall of the tower is a dedication stone dating to 23 April 685, making this one of, if not the oldest, church dedication stones in England. The Church was dedicated to St Paul in the 15th year of King Ecgfrith and the 4th year of the Abbot Ceolfrith. The remains and markers for some of the later (medieval) abbey can be found in the church ground. In 794, the Vikings sacked the church and monastery, but in 1074 it was repaired and the monastery refounded by Aidwin, Prior of Winchcombe Abbey in Gloucestershire. The monastery became a daughter house of the Benedictine community in Durham. At the dissolution of the monasteries, St Paul's became a parish church.

Gothic and Gothic Revival

The rest of the church is much later. The late 15th-century choir stalls on the north side of the chancel are noteworthy. The nave and the north aisle were built by Sir George Gilbert Scott. There is, in addition to the older windows, including a few pieces of Anglo-Saxon stained glass, a more modern window by John Piper (1903–92).The church also has on display Bede’s Chair (but evidence suggests that this originated after Bede's death).

Modern
Three works by Fenwick Lawson can be found in the church, The Risen Ascended Christ, Bede, and St Michael and the Devil.

References

Other References
 Boyle, J. R. (1887). Hand-book to the Church and Monastery of St. Paul, Jarrow: with a short account of the life of the Venerable Bede. Newcastle-on-Tyne: W. Scott.
 Colgrave, Bertram. (1959). A Guide to St. Paul's Church, Jarrow, and its Monastic Buildings, 	Gloucester
 Cramp, R. J. (1976). St Paul’s Church, Jarrow. The archaeological study of Churches (CBA research report 13., p. 28‑36). Londres: Addyman (P.) & Morris (R.).
 Jenkins, Simon. (2002). England's thousand best churches. London: Penguin Books.

7th-century church buildings in England
Church of England church buildings in Tyne and Wear